Origanum syriacum; syn. Majorana syriaca (also Origanum maru, although this primarily refers to a hybrid of O. syriacum), bible hyssop, Biblical-hyssop, Lebanese oregano or Syrian oregano, is an aromatic perennial herb in the mint family, Lamiaceae.

Etymology
The plant may be called za'atar by association with its use in an herb-spice mixture. In Modern Hebrew, it is called ezov, and it may have been the אֵזוֹב ezov of Classical Hebrew. In many English translations of the Bible, ezov is rendered as hyssop, hence the common name for bible hyssop, believed to be a different plant generally identified with Hyssopus officinalis.

The problems with identification arise from Jewish oral tradition where it expressly prohibits Greek hyssop, and where the biblical plant is said to have been identical to the Arabic word, zaatar (Origanum syriacum), and which word is not to be associated with other types of ezov that often bear an additional epithet, such as zaatar farsi = Persian-hyssop (Thymus capitatus) and zaatar rumi = Roman-hyssop (Satureja thymbra) and zaatar mani = calamint (Calamintha incana).

Description

Origanum syriacum grows to a height of 1 meter. The plant is pollinated by bees. Flowers are small and white or pale pink.

Distribution
Origanum syriacum is native to the Middle East. In Egypt, Origanum syriacum subsp. sinaicum is a very rare plant that grows on stony ground in Sinai Peninsula including the coastal Mediterranean strip. Wild hyssop and sage are protected under Israeli law as endangered plants, but no major studies on their status have been conducted since 1977.

Use
It is a preferred primary ingredient in the spice mixture za'atar. So precious is this herb that in the Levant, Arabs will send out foraging parties to gather it. Origanum syriacum is harvested in the wild for use in preparing za'atar, a mixture of dried herbs, sesame and sumac for flavoring and garnish. However, following the implementation of protective laws, those caught collecting wild hyssop can be prosecuted and face large fines. It has recently entered cultivation due to high levels of demand.

Further reading

References

External links

 Wild Flowers of Israel. Majorana syriaca

syriacum
Flora of Western Asia
Plants described in 1753
Garden plants
Medicinal plants
Taxa named by Carl Linnaeus
Plants in the Bible